Alfred Norman Bradford (14 August 1894 – 4 August 1916) was an Australian rules footballer who played with South Melbourne in the Victorian Football League.

Family
Son of Alfred David Bradford (1858-1941), and Margaret Mary Bradford (1865-1946), née Thompson, Alfred Norman Bradford was born at Ascot Vale, Victoria on 14 August 1894.

Football
Recruited from Yarraville Football Club in the Metropolitan Junior Football Association (MJFA), he played 7 senior games with South Melbourne in 1915.

His first match for the South Melbourne First XVIII was against St Kilda on 24 April 1915, and his seventh and last match, prior to his enlistment was against Fitzroy on 24 July 1915.

Military service
He enlisted in the First AIF in July 1915; and, leaving Australia on the HMAT Ulysses (A38) on 27 October 1915, he served overseas in the Australian Imperial Force as a Corporal in the 23rd Battalion of the Australian Infantry.

Death
Bradford was killed in action while in charge of a section of his battalion's bomb throwers, at Pozières, France, on 4 August 1916.

His name is engraved on the Villers-Bretonneux Memorial, a memorial to all Australian soldiers who fought in France and Belgium during the First World War whose graves are not known.

See also
 List of Victorian Football League players who died in active service

Footnotes

References
 Holmesby, Russell & Main, Jim (2007). The Encyclopedia of AFL Footballers. 7th ed. Melbourne: Bas Publishing.
 Main, J. & Allen, D., "Bradford, Norman", pp. 23–25 in Main, J. & Allen, D., Fallen – The Ultimate Heroes: Footballers Who Never Returned From War, Crown Content, (Melbourne), 2002. 
 First World War Nominal Roll: Corporal Alfred Norman Bradford (2577), collection of the Australian War Memorial.
 First World War Embarkation Roll: Private Alfred Norman Bradford (2577), collection of the Australian War Memorial.
 World War One Service Record: Corporal Alfred Norman Bradford (2577), National Archives of Australia.
 Roll of Honour Circular: Corporal Alfred Norman Bradford (2577), collection of the Australian War Memorial.
 Roll of Honour: Corporal Alfred Norman Bradford (2577), Australian War Memorial.
 Corporal Alfred Norman Bradford (2577), Commonwealth War Graves Commission.

External links

 

1894 births
1916 deaths
Australian rules footballers from Victoria (Australia)
Sydney Swans players
Yarraville Football Club players
Australian Army soldiers
Australian military personnel killed in World War I